Captain Prabhakaran is a 1991 Indian Tamil-language action film directed by R. K. Selvamani. It stars Vijayakanth in the lead role. It also features Mansoor Ali Khan, Rupini, Livingston and Ramya Krishnan, while R. Sarathkumar appears in a cameo role. It was Vijayakanth's 100th film, after which he earned the sobriquet "captain".

The character of the antagonist Veerabhadran, played by Mansoor Ali Khan, is loosely based on the forest brigand Veerappan. The title of the film was inspired from Velupillai Prabhakaran, the leader of the Liberation Tigers of Tamil Eelam. Upon its release, the film became a blockbuster at the box office.

Plot 
Captain Prabhakaran is an IFS officer (Indian Forest Service) sent to Sathyamangalam to nab Veerabhadran, who tortures the people of that place. Prabhakaran is not only going to nab Veerabhadran, but also avenge the death of his friend Rajaraman IFS, who was a forest officer killed by Veerabhadran. The police commissioner and the district collector are corrupt and also support Veerabhadran. In the climax, Veerabhadran kidnaps Prabhakaran's wife and son. Prabhakaran arrives at the right time and saves his wife and son. He then nabs Veerabhadran. Poongudi was Rajaraman's lover.  She dies while giving birth to his child. Veerabhadran is shot dead by the corrupt inspector and collector. Prabhakaran kills both of them. He is then dragged to court for killing the police inspector and the collector. Prabhakaran tells the truth that they were corrupt, and the film ends with Prabhakaran being released from the court.

Cast 
 Vijayakanth as Captain Prabhakaran IFS, District forest officer
 Sarathkumar as Rajaraman IFS
 M. N. Nambiar as Police Officer in charge of Special Task Force
 Rupini as Gayathri
 Ramya Krishnan as Poongudi
 Mansoor Ali Khan as Veerabhadran
 Livingston as Krishnamurthy (Poongudi's Brother)
Peeli Sivam as Raja
Ganthimathi as Fathima beevi
Yuvasri as Rajaraman's Sister
Ponnambalam as Sub Inspector (uncredited)
LIC Narasimhan as Police officer
Karikalan as Mansoor ali khan's henchman (uncredited)
Kalabhavan Mani (Junior artist)

Production 
After the success of Pulan Visaranai, Rowther decided to make another project with Vijayakanth and R. K. Selvamani titled Captain Prabhakaran, the plotline of the film was based on the forest brigand Veerappan. The film also was the 100th project of Vijayakanth. The filming was held at Chalakudy for 60 days. Many scenes were also filmed at Athirappilly Falls. The film had Mansoor Ali Khan in his first major role. During the shoot, a rope to which Vijayakanth was bound snapped and his shoulder got dislocated. With both his hands tied he screamed in pain, but this was mistaken for acting, and as a result, there was a delay in getting medical assistance. Saranya Ponvannan was originally cast as Poongudi, but left the film as the role was glamorous; the role went to Ramya Krishnan.

Soundtrack 
The soundtrack has only two songs, both composed by Ilaiyaraaja while the lyrics were written by Gangai Amaran and Piraisoodan. The song "Aattama Therottama" is set in the Carnatic raga known as Sindhu Bhairavi. It was later remixed by Prasanna Sekhar in Singakutty (2008).

Reception 
The Indian Express wrote, "The strength of the film is its visual vibrancy and the narrative line too has a great measure of cohesion, despite it being an action film all the way." Unlike other Tamil actors who did not face success with their 100th film, Vijayakanth was considered by N. Kesavan of The Hindu to have broken that jinx.

References

External links 

1990s Tamil-language films
1991 films
Fictional portrayals of the Tamil Nadu Police
Films directed by R. K. Selvamani
Films scored by Ilaiyaraaja
Films set in forests
Films shot in Chalakudy
Films shot in Thrissur
Indian action films
Indian films based on actual events